William Stephen George Mann (born 8 June 1962) is a Canadian engineer, professor, and inventor who works in augmented reality, computational photography, particularly wearable computing, and high-dynamic-range imaging. Mann is sometimes labeled the "Father of Wearable Computing" for early inventions and continuing contributions to the field. He cofounded InteraXon, makers of the Muse brain-sensing headband, and is also a founding member of the IEEE Council on Extended Intelligence (CXI). Mann is currently CTO and cofounder at Blueberry X Technologies and Chairman of MannLab.
Mann was born in Canada, and currently lives in Toronto, Canada, with his wife and two children.

Early life and education 
Mann holds a PhD in Media Arts and Sciences (1997) from the Massachusetts Institute of Technology and a B.Sc., B.Eng. and M.Eng. from McMaster University in 1987, 1989 and 1992, respectively. He was also inducted into the McMaster University Alumni Hall of Fame, Alumni Gallery 2004, in recognition of his career as an inventor and teacher. While at MIT, in then Director Nicholas Negroponte's words, "Steve Mann … brought the seed" that founded the Wearable Computing group in the Media Lab and "Steve Mann is the perfect example of someone … who persisted in his vision and ended up founding a new discipline." In 2004 he was named the recipient of the 2004 Leonardo Award for Excellence for his article "Existential Technology," published in Leonardo 36:1.

He is also General Chair of the IEEE International Symposium on Technology and Society, Associate Editor of IEEE Technology and Society, is a licensed Professional Engineer, and Senior Member of the IEEE, as well as a member of the IEEE Council on Extended Intelligence (CXI).

Career 
Mann is a tenured full professor at the Department of Electrical and Computer Engineering, with cross-appointments to the Faculty of Arts and Sciences and Faculty of Forestry at the University of Toronto, and is a Professional Engineer licensed through Professional Engineers Ontario.

Ideas and inventions 

Many of Mann's inventions pertain to the field of computational photography.
Chirplet transform, 1991: Mann was the first to propose and reduce to practice a signal representation based on a family of chirp signals, each associated with a coefficient, in a generalization of the wavelet transform that is now referred to as the chirplet transform.
"Digital Eye Glass," "Eye Glass," "Glass Eye," or "Glass", 1978: a device that, when worn, causes the human eye itself to effectively become both an electronic camera and a television display.
Comparametric equations, 1993: Mann was the first to propose and implement an algorithm to estimate a camera's response function from a plurality of differently exposed images of the same subject matter. He was also the first to propose and implement an algorithm to automatically extend dynamic range in an image by combining multiple differently exposed pictures of the same subject matter.
High-dynamic-range imaging (HDR): "The first report of digitally combining multiple pictures of the same scene to improve dynamic range appears to be Mann." (Robertson et al.) Mann's work on wearable computing was motivated by his early computer vision systems that helped people see better (e.g. while welding, or in other high-dynamic range situations, with dynamic range management, overlays, and augmentation as well as diminishment in both the additive and subtractive sense).
Hydraulophone: Mann invented an experimental musical instrument that uses pressurized hydraulic fluid, such as water, to make sound. The instrument is played by placing the fingers in direct contact with the sound-producing hydraulic fluid, thus giving the musician a high degree of control over the musical expression in the sound.
Integral kinematics and integral kinesiology: principles of negative derivatives (integrals) of displacement, such as absement (the area under the displacement-time curve), as embodied by hydraulophones (water-based instruments). This work has been built upon by others, and also forms the basis for a new way of understanding electrical engineering. See also Mann's 2014 paper, "Integral Kinematics (Time‐Integrals of Distance, Energy, etc.) and Integral Kinesiology."
Natural user interface: In the 1980s and '90s, Mann developed a number of user-interface strategies using natural interaction with the real world as an alternative to a command-line interface (CLI) or graphical user interface (GUI). Mann referred to this work as "Natural User Interfaces", "Direct User Interfaces", and "Metaphor-Free Computing"
 Scratch input, an acoustic-based method of Human-Computer Interaction (HCI) that takes advantage of the characteristic sound produced when a finger nail, stick, or other object strikes or is dragged over a surface, such as a table or wall.
Sensory Singularity, together with Marvin Minsky and Ray Kurzweil, Mann proposed the theory of the "Sensularity" Sensory Singularity and cyborg-logging.
Surveilluminescent wand: a device for visualizing vision and seeing sight, by way of making visible the sightfield (time-reversed lightfield) of a camera or similar computer vision sensor, using time-exposure with array of surveilluminescent lights to make visible to one camera what another camera can see.
Telepointer and SixthSense, a wearable computer based on a pendant that contains a webcam and laser-based infinite depth-of-focus projector, and related technologies for gesture-based wearable computing systems.
Video Orbits, 1993: Mann was the first to produce an algorithm for automatically combining multiple pictures of the same subject matter, using algebraic projective geometry, to "stitch together" images using automatically estimated perspective correction. This is called the "Video Orbits" algorithm.

Mann also works in the fields of computer-mediated reality. He is a strong advocate of privacy rights, for which work he was an award recipient of the Chalmers Foundation in the fine arts. His work also extends to the area of sousveillance (a term he coined for "inverse surveillance"). Mann and one of his PhD students, James Fung, together with some of his other students, have been building a cyborg community around the cyborg-logging concept.
 Mann, together with Professor Ian Kerr at the University of Ottawa, has written extensively on surveillance, sousveillance, and equiveillance. "Sousveillance," a term coined by Mann, along with the concepts that he and Kerr have developed around these ideas, have created a new dialog for cyborg technologies, as well as related personal information gathering technologies like camera phones. He has created the related concept of humanistic intelligence.
 In 2003, Joi Ito credited Mann with having initiated the moblogging movement by creating a system for transmission of realtime pictures, video, and text. In particular, from 1994 to 1996, Mann continuously transmitted his life's experiences, in real time, to his website for others to experience, interact with, and respond to.

His CyborGLOGS ('glogs), such as the spontaneous reporting of news as everyday experience, were an early predecessor of 'blogs and the concept of blogging, and earlier than that, his pre-internet-era live streaming of personal documentary and cyborg communities defined cyborg-logging as a new form of social networking.

Anonequity project 
Mann is currently collaborating with a number of researchers including Ian Kerr, Canada Research Chair in Ethics, Law & Technology, University of Ottawa, who teaches a course on "Cyborg Law" that uses Mann's book. Mann, together with Kerr and others, are doing an SSHRC-funded project to study the Ethics, Law & Technology of anonymity, authentication, surveillance, and sousveillance, in addition to issues related to cyborg-law. The anonequity project is ongoing, and collaborator Kerr has also researched and lectured widely on implantable technologies.

Media coverage 
Mann has been referred to as the "father of wearable computing", having created the first general-purpose wearable computer, in contrast to previous wearable devices that perform one specific function such as time-keeping (e.g. wristwatch); calculations (e.g. wearable abacus); or Edward O. Thorp and Claude Shannon's wearable computers, which were timing devices concealed in shoes or cigarette packs and designed for cheating at a game of roulette.

Mann has also been described as "the world's first cyborg" in Canadian popular press such as NOW, The Globe and Mail, National Post, and Toronto Life, but has himself rejected the term "cyborg" as being too vague.

Publications 
Mann is author of more than 200 publications, including a textbook on electric eyeglasses and a popular culture book on day-to-day cyborg living. Selected works:
 Intelligent Image Processing 
 Cyborg: Digital Destiny and Human Possibility in the Age of the Wearable Computer Randomhouse Doubleday 2001
 The Wireless Application Protocol (WAP): A Wiley Tech Brief  
 International Journal of Human-Computer Interaction 2003: Special Issue : Mediated Reality  
 Advanced Palm Programming: Developing Real-World Applications''

See also 
 Gordon Bell
 Ray Kurzweil
 Marvin Minsky
 Kevin Warwick
 Surveillance art
 Chorded keyboard

References

External links 

 Mann's current web site as of 2015
 EyeTap Personal Imaging (ePi) Lab
 Mann's website (wearcam.org)
 Publications

Human–computer interaction researchers
1962 births
Living people
Canadian electrical engineers
Massachusetts Institute of Technology alumni
McMaster University alumni
Academic staff of the University of Toronto
People from Hamilton, Ontario
Canadian transhumanists
MIT Media Lab people
Canadian expatriate academics in the United States
20th-century Canadian engineers
21st-century Canadian engineers
Canadian inventors